Ernesto Saro Boardman (born 25 July 1950) is a Mexican politician affiliated with the PAN. He served as Senator of the LX Legislature of the Mexican Congress representing Coahuila. He also served as Deputy during the LVII Legislature.

References

1950 births
Living people
Politicians from Coahuila
Members of the Senate of the Republic (Mexico)
Members of the Chamber of Deputies (Mexico)
National Action Party (Mexico) politicians
21st-century Mexican politicians
Monterrey Institute of Technology and Higher Education